National Highway 21 (NH 21) is a primary national highway in India.

Route
 Jaipur to Bharatpur
 Bharatpur to Agra
 Agra to Sikandra Rao
 Sikandra Rao to Budaun
 Budaun to Bareilly

Jaipur to Agra section of NH 21 was known as NH 11 before renumbering of all national highways by Ministry of Road Transport and Highways in 2010.

Junctions  

  Terminal near Jaipur.
  near Jaipur
  near Jaipur
  near Dausa
  near Mahwa
  near Uncha Nagla
  near Kiraoli
  near Kiraoli
  near Agra
  near Sikandra Rao
  near Sikandra Rao
  Terminal near Bareilly.

See also 
 List of National Highways in India
 List of National Highways in India by state

References

External links
 NH 21 on OpenStreetMap

National highways in India
National Highways in Rajasthan
National Highways in Uttar Pradesh
Transport in Jaipur
Transport in Bareilly